PSMA may refer to:

 Port State Measures Agreement, an international treaty
 Prostate-specific membrane antigen, a human enzyme

See also
 Proteasome endopeptidase complex subunits:
 PSMA1
 PSMA2
 PSMA3
 PSMA4
 PSMA5
 PSMA6
 PSMA7
 PSMA8